Indian Mounds Regional Park is a public park in Saint Paul, Minnesota, United States, featuring six burial mounds overlooking the Mississippi River.  The oldest mounds were constructed beginning about 2,500 years ago by local Indigenous people linked to the Archaic period, who may have been inspired by of the burial style known as the Hopewell Tradition. Mdewakanton Dakota people are also known from historic documents to have interred their dead here well into the historic period.  At least 31 mounds were destroyed by development in the late 19th century. This burial mound group includes the tallest mounds constructed by people Indigenous to in Minnesota and Wisconsin (except for the unique  Grand Mound outside International Falls, Minnesota). Indian Mounds Regional Park is a component of the Mississippi National River and Recreation Area, a unit of the National Park System. In 2014, the extant Mounds Group was listed in the National Register of Historic Places.  The nomination document provides a description of the archaeology and the context. A recent Cultural Landscape Study provides more context regarding the cultural landscape.

Early history
There were once at least 19 mounds at the intact group, plus another 32 a short distance to the northwest directly above Carver's Cave, known as Wakan Tipi in the Mdewakanton language and considered a sacred place by the Dakota. In 1957, Eldon Johnson linked archaeological information taken from the cemetery in the late 19th century to the burial styles of the Hopewell Burial Tradition. However, the closest cultural affiliations are to people Indigenous to this location, and there has never been a cultural group of Hopewell People in Minnesota. No evidence of habitation has been found among the mounds. Typically, burial mounds and scaffolds were built on high locations in sight of related nearby villages that were located near fresh water. In this case, the historic Dakota village Kaposia, which was located near Pig's Eye Lake, is closely linked to the cemetery. The Dakota village of Kaposia was established well before 1600 CE. and explorer Jonathan Carver described the site in 1766 noting that burial of a Dakota leader took place at this place at that time.

Survey and Excavation
A burial mounds was first plundered by Edward Duffield Neill in 1856. In 1862, 21 mound locations at the northwestern "Dayton's Bluff" group and 16 or 17 at the Indian Mounds Park Group were documented in a survey made by Alfred Hill and William Wallace, were members of the Archaeological Committee of the Minnesota Historical Society. This survey was followed by amateuar Antiquarian excavations sponsored in 1886 and 1867 that involved minimal trenching in mounds.  For example, the excavation of one Mound consisted of about 3% of one mound. 1879, Theodore H. Lewis resurveyed the mound group adding some mound locations .  Both mound groups revealed a variety of burial styles.  At least three mounds were built around log tombs, and two others contained multiple cists made of limestone slabs.  Grave goods included mussel shells in the simplest and most common burials, and projectile points, perforated bear teeth, and copper ornaments in others.  One burial contained a child's skull with unfired clay pressed onto it, perhaps in an apparent recreation of the individual's features.  No other such death masks have been documented in local contemporaneous Native American burials.  Human remains in funeral bundles found in the upper parts of some mounds have been interpreted as secondary burials from more recent time periods.

The early Antiquarian archaeologists exhumed around 20 mostly complete skeletons (though many were missing their skulls) and fragments of perhaps another 30 individuals, but they did not screen soil and  noted that they returned skeletal remains to their backfilled trenches.  Excavations only impacted small fractions of the mound centers, so the actual numbers of individuals buried here in unknown.

These 19th-century archaeologists, "some of them amateurs in their day, all of them amateurs by today's standards," may have destroyed as much information as they preserved.  Theodore Lewis was a sophisticated surveyor for his time, but worked hastily — once excavating seven mounds in one day — and did not make detailed descriptions of his finds.  Most of the artifacts Lewis collected were sold and have since been lost. However, reexamination of stone tools Lewis found in association with the stone cists, which are still held by the Minnesota Historical Society, show that they were made of local materials and date to the Late Archaic period, placing the first burials at this cemetery to at least 2,500 years ago, when mound burials were not typically made in this region.

In the late 19th century, the bluff-face was successively demolished to widen the rail yard at its foot, destroying several mounds as well as the outer chamber of Carver's Cave. In a time "when digging into a mound was a respectable Sunday pastime," locals also repeatedly looted and vandalized the mounds.

The mound site received a modern archaeological field survey in 1981 from the Minnesota Historical Society,  excavations under the Air Mail beacon took were conducted by Christina Harrison in 1994, and geophysical surveys by Archaeo-Physics in 2012 supported the National Register Nomination.

Park development
Interest in preserving the open land along the blufftop arose in the 1880s as the local population boomed.  The City of Saint Paul struggled to buy the land from its various private owners, as some proved unwilling to sell and others sold to real estate speculators first.  Enough property was assembled by 1896 for the city to begin landscaping and building visitor amenities.  In sharp contrast to modern practices, 11 mounds were leveled on the grounds that they blocked the view of the river.  Only the six largest mounds were left.

Indian Mounds Regional Park received a major restoration in the 1980s using state and federal funds for developing the Great River Road.  The pavilion was restored, new amenities added, and houses and a road were removed.  The Dayton's Bluff Community Council raised funds and placed decorative fences around the mounds as a protection from visitors.

Airway beacon

Adjacent to the mounds is a  airway beacon built in 1929 as part of a national network to aid pilots delivering airmail.  The Indian Mounds Park "Airway" Beacon, as it is officially known, helped mark the route between Saint Paul and Chicago.  There were once over 600 of these beacons, but electronic navigation systems rendered them obsolete.  Restored to its historical black and chrome-yellow color scheme in the mid-1990s, the Indian Mounds Park beacon has been kept operational and flashes its rotating light every 5 seconds.  It is one of the few remaining airway beacons in the United States.

Recreation
Indian Mounds Regional Park provides two electrified picnic shelters which can be rented by private groups.  Other visitor amenities in the park include a playground, barbecue grills, fire rings, restrooms and a drinking fountain, paved trails, and a ball field and tennis courts.

See also
 List of Hopewell sites
 List of burial mounds in the United States
 Mississippi National River and Recreation Area
 National Register of Historic Places listings in Ramsey County, Minnesota

References

External links

 Indian Mounds Regional Park
 Excavation Records for Indian Mounds Park Group

1893 establishments in Minnesota
Archaeological sites on the National Register of Historic Places in Minnesota
Cemeteries on the National Register of Historic Places in Minnesota
Dakota
Historic districts on the National Register of Historic Places in Minnesota
Hopewellian peoples
National Register of Historic Places in Mississippi National River and Recreation Area
Mounds in Minnesota
National Register of Historic Places in Saint Paul, Minnesota
Native American history of Minnesota
Parks in Saint Paul, Minnesota
Protected areas established in 1893
Protected areas on the Mississippi River
Regional parks in Minnesota
Religious places of the indigenous peoples of North America